The Red Crag Formation is a geological formation in England. It outcrops in south-eastern Suffolk and north-eastern Essex. The name derives from its iron-stained reddish colour and crag which is an East Anglian word for shells. It is part of the Crag Group, a series of notably marine strata which belong to a period when Britain was connected to continental Europe by the Weald–Artois Anticline, and the area in which the Crag Group was deposited was a tidally dominated marine bay. This bay would have been subjected to enlargement and contraction brought about by transgressions and regressions driven by the 40,000-year Milankovitch cycles.

The sediment in the outcrops mainly consists of coarse-grained and shelly sands that were deposited in sand waves (megaripples) that migrated parallel to the shore in a south-westward direction. The most common fossils are bivalves and gastropods that were often worn by the abrasive environment. At the coastline by Walton-on-the-Naze, remains of megalodon were found.

The Red Crag Formation at depth in eastern Suffolk clearly has one member, the Sizewell Member, a coarse shelly sand with thin beds of clay and silt. It was interpreted as having been deposited in large scale sand waves where the sea bed was deeper. The overlying Thorpeness Member, was provisionally assigned to the Red Crag based on its lithology but there is more evidence to suggest that it is part of the Norwich Crag Formation.

It has been proposed that the Red Crag started in the late Pliocene and to have possibly extended up into the early Pleistocene, but there is disagreement on more precise dating. According to the British Geological Survey, the Red Crag sits within a segment of time from about 3.3 to 2.5 mya. It is considered that the Red Crag at Walton-on-the–Naze is the oldest and that it was deposited in only a few decades at some time between 2.9 and 2.6 mya. This has led to the UK stratigraphic stage name Waltonian, which is usually correlated with the final Pliocene Reuverian Stage in the Netherlands. There are difficulties in reconciling how the Red Crag equates with international chronological stages. In particular, the start and end dates are poorly defined due to the general paucity of age-diagnostic stratigraphic indicators and the fragmentary nature of the geology. It can also be difficult to separate the Red Crag from the overlying Norwich Crag Formation.

References

Bibliography 
 

 

Geologic formations of England
Neogene United Kingdom
Escarpments of England